Saheed Adebayo Akinfenwa (born 10 May 1982) is an English footballer who plays as a striker for Faversham Town.

Akinfenwa's professional breakthrough came at Doncaster Rovers, having spent time up until then in the lower leagues of English football as well as spells in Lithuania and Wales. Following a short but successful time at Doncaster, Akinfenwa moved to his seventh club, Torquay United. He proved to be a goal threat but left the struggling team the following season to join Swansea City. After spending two seasons with the Welsh club, he joined League One side Millwall and later moved to Northampton Town. Akinfenwa spent six years switching from Northampton to Gillingham, where his goal-scoring ability was still apparent. In June 2014, he signed for League Two side AFC Wimbledon, and two years later Wycombe Wanderers, where he remained until his retirement in 2022. Akinfenwa made more appearances and scored more goals for Wycombe than for any other club he played at. His last professional match was at Wembley Stadium in the League One play-off final against Sunderland on 21 May 2022.

Personal life
Akinfenwa was born in Islington, North London, and is of Nigerian descent. His father is a Muslim and his mother is a Christian, and while Akinfenwa observed Ramadan as a child, he is now a Christian. He is a close friend of Clarke Carlisle, his former teammate at Northampton Town. As a child, he supported Liverpool and his favourite player was John Barnes.

Akinfenwa has been ranked as the strongest footballer in the world in various editions of the FIFA videogame series. In September 2014 he was invited to attend the launch party for FIFA 15 alongside various celebrities and Premier League players, including Rio Ferdinand, George Groves and Lethal Bizzle. He runs a clothing label called Beast Mode On which plays on his strong man reputation. His autobiography The Beast: My Story was published by Headline Publishing in 2017.

Career

Early career
As a teenager, Akinfenwa joined the Lithuanian club FK Atlantas on the advice of his agent, whose Lithuanian wife's brother knew a member of the coaching staff there. While with the club Akinfenwa scored the winning goal in the 2001 Lithuanian Football Cup final and played in the UEFA Cup qualifying rounds for two successive seasons. He received racial abuse from fans in the country, later saying "Coming from London, where nobody would disrespect me, this was just brazen". He spent two years at the club before returning to the UK early in 2003, where he joined Welsh Premier League champions Barry Town. Akinfenwa helped Barry to Welsh Cup and Welsh Premier League silverware during his time at Jenner Park. However, just a handful of matches into his stint, the club suffered a financial crisis and released its professional playing staff. Akinfenwa quickly joined Boston United in October 2003, scoring a last minute winner on his debut against Swindon Town in the Football League Trophy. Unable to settle, he moved to Leyton Orient the following month, but was released after one month. In December 2003 he moved to Rushden & Diamonds and in February 2004 joined Doncaster Rovers, his fifth club of the season.

Torquay United
In July 2004, Akinfenwa changed clubs again, signing for Torquay United, as a replacement for David Graham. He scored 14 league goals during the 2004–05 season and was named the supporter's Player of the Season but was unable to help the club avoid relegation to League Two. He declined to sign a new contract with Torquay at the end of the season.

Swansea City
In July 2005, Akinfenwa moved to Swansea City, who were ordered to pay an £85,000 fee as compensation, significantly below the £300,000 asking price Torquay had set for his signature. He scored on his debut against Tranmere Rovers, and this was also the first competitive goal scored at Swansea's new Liberty Stadium. He scored the winning goal in the 2006 Football League Trophy Final, in which Swansea beat Carlisle United 2–1. He also helped Swansea reach the League One promotion play-off final in his first season. After a 2–2 draw, the match went to a penalty shoot-out but Akinfenwa was one of two Swansea players to miss with their penalties, granting promotion to Barnsley. He was a regular the following season, until a broken right leg in the 2–0 defeat at home to Scunthorpe United ended his season. This followed a fractured left shin the previous October.

Millwall
At the end of the 2006–07 season, he rejected a new contract with Swansea, and agreed to sign for Swindon Town on 29 June 2007. However, he failed a medical.

After a period of rehabilitation and training at Gillingham, he joined League One team Millwall on a month-to-month contract in November 2007. However he failed to score any goals in seven appearances.

Northampton Town
On 18 January 2008 Akinfenwa signed a deal with Northampton Town until the end of the 2007–08 season. He made his debut against Swindon Town, where he came off the bench to score a late equaliser in a 1–1 draw. He then had the same impact in his home debut, scoring the equaliser in a 1–1 draw against Leeds United. Despite not featuring in the following game against Yeovil Town, he started the next home match against Gillingham, and scored two goals in a 4–0 win. He scored three further goals that season.

On 30 May 2008, Akinfenwa signed a new one-year contract at Northampton despite declared interest from Leyton Orient and Grimsby Town. He started the 2008–09 season well, scoring twice in three matches by the end of September.

Akinfenwa ended his stay at Northampton in May 2010. He had been offered a new deal but Northampton could not agree a deal with him within an agreed timeframe.

Gillingham

On 29 July 2010, he signed for Gillingham on a one-year contract, and scored on his debut with a header against Cheltenham Town. Whilst at the Gills, Akinfenwa was able to form a strong partnership with Cody McDonald and the pair were able to score 36 goals between them that season.

Return to Northampton Town
Akinfenwa was offered a new contract by Gillingham at the conclusion of 2010–11 season, but chose instead to return to Sixfields on 25 May 2011, after new Cobblers manager Gary Johnson brought him in to "capture the imagination of the supporters". He scored his first goal against Bristol Rovers on 16 August. On 10 November 2012 in a match against Accrington Stanley, Akinfenwa scored his first, and to date only, professional hat-trick. Three years later, with Northampton struggling financially, Akinfenwa auctioned off the shirt he wore in this match and donated the proceeds to a supporters' trust, raising £440.
Northampton Town released him at the end of the 2012–13 season.

Return to Gillingham
Akinfenwa re-signed for Gillingham on a free transfer on 2 July 2013. After reigniting his successful partnership with Cody McDonald, scoring 10 goals over the course of the 2013–14 season and coming third in their Supporters Player of the Year awards, Akinfenwa left the club on expiry of his one-year contract.

AFC Wimbledon

On 20 June 2014, he signed for League Two side AFC Wimbledon, who had pursued his signature for 14 months. In the third round of the FA Cup on 5 January 2015, in which AFC Wimbledon hosted Liverpool at Kingsmeadow, Akinfenwa equalised against the club he supports, albeit in a 1–2 defeat. On 8 June 2015, Akinfenwa extended his contract with Wimbledon, spurning interests from clubs in League One and Major League Soccer. On 30 May 2016, after scoring a penalty in a 2–0 win against Plymouth Argyle in the League Two Play-off Final, Akinfenwa was released from his contract. He told Sky Sports in his post-match interview: "I think I'm technically unemployed, so any managers hit me up on the WhatsApp and get me a job."

Wycombe Wanderers
Following his departure from AFC Wimbledon, Akinfenwa signed for Wycombe Wanderers. In April 2018, he was nominated for the EFL League Two Player of the Season award. With his strike against Doncaster Rovers on 29 February 2020, Akinfenwa became Wycombe's record goal scorer in the English Football League with 54 goals. On 13 July 2020, Akinfenwa and Wycombe won the 2020 League One play-off Final over Oxford gaining promotion to the Championship for the first time in both the player's career and the club's history. Akinfenwa finished the season as the club's joint-top league goal scorer with 10 goals.

On 8 July 2021, Akinfenwa signed a new one-year contract with the club. He confirmed that it would be his last season in professional football, and indicated that after football he was considering moving into acting or professional wrestling. Akinfenwa's last game for Wycombe was the 2022 League One play-off Final, where he featured as a 75th minute substitute but could not prevent a 2–0 loss to Sunderland.

Faversham Town
In March 2023, Akinfenwa came out of retirement and joined Faversham Town of the Isthmian League.  He made his debut against Lancing on 11 March.

Career statistics

Honours

FK Atlantas
Lithuanian Football Cup: 2000–01

Barry Town
Welsh Premier League: 2002–03
Welsh Cup: 2002–03

Swansea City
Football League Trophy: 2005–06

AFC Wimbledon
Football League Two play-offs: 2016

Wycombe Wanderers
EFL League One play-offs: 2020

Individual
EFL League Two Player of the Month: November 2012
EFL Team of the Season: 2017–18
PFA Team of the Year: 2017–18 League Two
Torquay United Player of the Year: 2004–05
Northampton Town Player of the Year: 2009–10
AFC Wimbledon Player of the Year: 2014–15
Wycombe Wanderers Player of the Season: 2016–17, 2017–18

References

External links

Adebayo Akinfenwa  on wycombewanderers.co.uk

1982 births
Living people
British former Muslims
Converts to Protestantism from Islam
English Christians
Yoruba sportspeople
Black British sportsmen
Footballers from Islington (district)
English footballers
Association football forwards
Watford F.C. players
FK Atlantas players
Barry Town United F.C. players
Boston United F.C. players
Leyton Orient F.C. players
Rushden & Diamonds F.C. players
Doncaster Rovers F.C. players
Torquay United F.C. players
Swansea City A.F.C. players
Millwall F.C. players
Northampton Town F.C. players
Gillingham F.C. players
AFC Wimbledon players
Wycombe Wanderers F.C. players
Faversham Town F.C. players
A Lyga players
Cymru Premier players
English Football League players
Isthmian League players
English expatriate footballers
Expatriate footballers in Lithuania
English expatriate sportspeople in Lithuania
English autobiographers